Corvo is a village in the province of Catanzaro,  in the Calabria region of southern Italy. It lies west of the Viale Magna Grecia.

External links
 "Corvo Map — Satellite Images of Corvo" Maplandia World Gazetteer

Frazioni of the Province of Catanzaro